Le maintien de l'ordre (Gallimard, 1961), translated as Law and Order, is a novel by French writer Claude Ollier written in classic nouveau roman style. The novel is divided into three parts, and is written primarily in the third-person, objective narrative mode.

English translations
Le maintien de l'ordre was translated by Ursule Molinaro for Red Dust in 1971.

References

1961 French novels
Éditions Gallimard books